Dasypogon obliquifolius is a species of shrub in the family Dasypogonaceae native to Western Australia.

References

Dasypogonaceae
Endemic flora of Western Australia